The women's 50 metre breaststroke event at the 2015 European Games in Baku took place on 23 June at the Aquatic Palace.

Results

Heats
The heats were started at 09:30.

Semifinals
The semifinals were started at 17:30.

Semifinal 1

Semifinal 2

Final
The final was held on at 19:08.

References

Women's 50 metre breaststroke
2015 in women's swimming